Revue de Bruxelles was a review published in Brussels from 1837 to 1850. The founding editors were Adolphe Deschamps and Pierre de Decker, whose intention was to produce a mix of original articles by Belgian writers together with summaries or translations of articles from reviews published in other countries. While the review was initially monthly, from 1842 it appeared only twice per year. Both founding editors resigned at the end of 1842, and a new editorial team took over, changing the title to Nouvelle Revue de Bruxelles in 1843. In 1846 the original title was restored, with the subtitle "Nouvelle série".

Notable contributors
 Joseph Jean De Smet

References

External links
 Revue de Bruxelles, July to September 1837, October to December 1837, January to March 1838, April to June 1838, January to March 1839, April to June 1839, July to September 1839, October to December 1839, January to March 1840, April to June 1840, July to September 1840, October to December 1840, October to December 1841, vol. 1 (1842), vol. 2 (1842).
 Nouvelle Revue de Bruxelles, 1843, 1844, 1845
 Revue de Bruxelles: Nouvelle série, vol. 1 (1846), vol. 2 (1846), vol. 3 (1847), vol. 4 (1847), vol. 5 (1848), vol. 6 (1848), vol. 7 (1849), vol. 8 (1849), vol. 9 (1850), vol. 10 (1850)

1837 establishments in Belgium
1850 disestablishments in Belgium
Biannual magazines
Cultural magazines
Defunct magazines published in Belgium
French-language magazines
Magazines established in 1837
Magazines disestablished in 1850
Magazines published in Brussels